Gutting may refer to:
 Disembowelment, the removal of the internal organs
A surname; notable people include:
Ernst Gutting (1919–2013), German Roman Catholic bishop
Gary Gutting (1942–2019), American philosopher
Olav Gutting (born 1970), German lawyer and politician

See also
Guting District, in Taiwan
Gut (surname)
Gut (disambiguation)

de:Gutting